The 2019 Manitoba Scotties Tournament of Hearts presented by Bayer, the provincial women's curling championship of Manitoba, was held from January 23 to 27 at the Gimli Recreation Complex in Gimli. The winning Tracy Fleury team represented Manitoba at the 2019 Scotties Tournament of Hearts in Sydney, Nova Scotia.

Qualification

Teams
The teams are listed as follows:

Round-robin standings

Round-robin results
All draw times are listed in Central Standard Time (UTC-06:00)

Draw 1
Wednesday, January 23, 08:30

Draw 2
Wednesday, January 23, 12:15

Draw 3
Wednesday, January 23, 16:00

Draw 4
Wednesday, January 23, 20:15

Draw 5
Thursday, January 24, 08:30

Draw 6
Thursday, January 24, 12:15

Draw 7
Thursday, January 24, 16:00

Draw 8
Thursday, January 24, 19:45

Draw 9
Friday, January 25, 08:30

Draw 10
Friday, January 25, 12:15

Draw 11
Friday, January 25, 16:00

Draw 12
Friday, January 25, 19:45

Draw 13
Saturday, January 26, 08:30

Draw 14
Saturday, January 26, 12:15

Tiebreaker
Saturday, January 26, 16:00

Playoffs
A new format involved ranking the top four teams regardless of which pool they were in, which meant that Team Einarson was put in the 3 vs. 4 game despite winning her pool. This new format was considered controversial by some of the curlers.

1 vs. 2
Saturday, January 26, 19:45

3 vs. 4
Saturday, January 26, 19:45

Semifinal
Sunday, January 27, 09:00

Final
Sunday, January 27, 15:00

References

External links

2019 Scotties Tournament of Hearts
Scotties Tournament of Hearts
Gimli, Manitoba
January 2019 sports events in Canada
Curling in Manitoba